Brandon Paris is a Canadian singer and song-writer, and former front man for the Brandon Paris Band.

Early life 
Paris was born Richard Lee on November 11, 1971 in Winnipeg, Manitoba and was raised in a middle-class household. His family is mixed-race; his mother was from Singapore and his father from Trinidad and Tobago. After his father's business failed, his parents moved to British Columbia, leaving Paris and his brother to live with their grandmother. During high school, Paris began struggling with depression, a condition he attributed to early-childhood sexual abuse by a neighbor. After graduating from high school in 1989, Paris studied Criminology with the intent of becoming a police officer but dropped out to start a company called Express Clothing. He started selling T-shirts out of the trunk of his car and the business flourished, to the point where the line was carried by some of Canada's largest clothing companies, however Paris was unable to keep up with production requirements and the company folded. This, combined with a break-up with a girlfriend, led to a suicide attempt; when he recovered, he joined his parents in British Columbia.

In 1994, Paris joined his father's multimedia company in Surrey, spending the next seven years as a video editor and animator. The effects of over-work, anxiety and the onset of Type 2 diabetes caused him to turn to drugs; by 1998, he was addicted to Methamphetamine and MDMA. This led to a deep depression, but depression helped him re-discover his love for music, and find his voice. He started writing songs and singing at parties, and the encouragement from audiences helped him beat his addiction. Also at this time, the Fitness World chain used Paris in its advertisements as a 'success story'. In 1998, he legally changed his name, choosing 'Brandon' because his idol, martial artist Bruce Lee, had named his son Brandon, and 'Paris' because it was more marketable than 'Lee'.

1999–2006: Music career & debut album 
In 1999 Paris moved to Long Beach, California, with $7,000 cash and hopes of putting together a band. He took vocal lessons and educated himself on the music industry but was not successful. He ran out of money and illegally obtained a green card, but was caught and deported back to Canada. While working at a Vancouver nightclub, he learned how to play the guitar, wrote songs, and took vocal lessons with Patricia Dahlquist. He started writing and performing his own songs and spent two years producing a self-financed album. This album did not meet with success but, in 2002, Paris was approached by bass player Dave Devindisch, who asked if he would be interested in recording a demo. Paris and Devindisch formed a two-man band and spent a year playing at local venues. In 2003, they met the Jamaican singer-songwriter DaGriff, who joined the band; he was followed by guitarist Greg Ellis and former Doug and the Slugs members, drummer Chris Murray Driver and keyboardist Marc Gladstone.

In 2005, Paris approached Vancouver record producers Troy Samson of Hipjoint Productions (Moka Only, Kreesha Turner, Snoop Dogg), and Jeff Dawson (State of Shock, Kelly Rowland, Daniel Powter), to rework six of the original recordings.

In January 2006, the newly-named Brandon Paris Band signed a deal with Koch Entertainment just days after sending out the album, titled On My Own, to record labels across Canada. The album's first single, Rewind and Start Again, was released on March 13, 2006 and was a huge success on commercial radio, climbing to the top 20 on the Canadian CHR charts (tracked by Radio & Records (Billboard Information Group)). The album's second single, Somebody to Hold, peaked at No. 53 on CHR (tracked by Radio & Records(Billboard Information Group)). A month later, in an attempt to get better results, Koch Entertainment released a third single, Give Me a Reason, but it was not enough to push the album further. However, in 2007, the band was nominated for Best New Group or Solo Artist (CHR) by the Canadian Radio Music Awards.

2008: Second album 

In 2007, Ellis and Devindisch were replaced by Bryan Jasper on guitar and Brian Sanheim on bass, and Paris starting writing songs for the band's second album, "Pocket Full of Holes". On this album, lyrics on every song are written by Brandon with two songs ("Masquerade" and "Twisted") co-written with Dagriff, one song ("Don't Fade") co-written with Marc Gladstone, and one song ("Voice Inside My Head") co-written with the entire band. All music was written by Bryan Jasper, with additions and changes by the rest of the band, except for "Don't Fade", "Voice Inside My Head" and "Never Get Enough".
Additional credits include Jeff Dawson, Sheldon Zaharko (Salteens, Billy Talent, Smugglers, New Pornographers, Barney Bentall, Ridley Bent), and Joao Carvalho (Hedley, Alexisonfire, Protest the Hero, David Usher, Matthew Good, Holly McNarland).

"Pocket Full of Holes" was independently released in Canada on December 1, 2008. The album's first single, Say Goodbye, mixed by Mike Fraser (AC/DC; Hedley) and mastered by Adam Ayan (Rolling Stones; Linkin Park), received airplay across Canada, including reporting stations, digital stations and satellite. Its accompanying video was directed, shot and edited by Pars on a $4.00 budget.

In late 2010, Paris was replaced by singer Scott Jackson and Brandon Paris Band became the band Abandon Paris.

Discography
2006: On My Own
2008: Pocket Full of Holes

References

1971 births
Living people
Canadian rock singers
Musicians from Winnipeg
People from Surrey, British Columbia
Canadian pop singers
21st-century Canadian male singers